Stacey Poon-Kinney is an American chef and restaurateur. She came to prominence as a contestant on the ninth season of the Food Network series Food Network Star.

Food Network

Restaurant: Impossible
In 2011, Poon-Kinney's restaurant, The Trails Neighborhood Eatery, was featured in an episode of the Food Network series Restaurant: Impossible. It was reported that after the show aired, the restaurant experienced an 80% increase in sales due in part to dinner service, which the restaurant did not previously offer.

Food Network Star
In 2013, it was announced that Poon-Kinney had been selected as a contestant on the ninth season of the Food Network series Food Network Star. Out of the twelve finalists, she proceeded to the top four, and she pitched an idea to producers for a potential series called Stacey's Modern Magic. Her elimination was met with anger and surprise by many viewers, and the decision was described as "shocking" by the season's eventual winner, Damaris Phillips.

Personal life

Poon-Kinney lives in Spring Valley, California with her husband, painter Saratoga Sake. They have two children.

References

External links
 

1970s births
American women restaurateurs
Businesspeople from San Diego
Date of birth missing (living people)
Food Network Star contestants
Living people
People from Spring Valley, San Diego County, California